Dezg or Dezag or Desok or Dozq may refer to various places in Iran:
 Dezak, Chaharmahal and Bakhtiari
 Dezak-e Olya, Chaharmahal and Bakhtiari Province
 Dezak-e Sofla, Chaharmahal and Bakhtiari Province
 Dezak-e Sarcheshmeh, Chaharmahal and Bakhtiari Province
 Dezak, Khuzestan
 Dezg-e Bala, South Khorasan Province
 Dezg-e Pain, South Khorasan Province

See also
 Dozak (disambiguation)
 Dozdak (disambiguation)